is a baseball manga series by Mitsuru Adachi. It was serialized in Monthly Shōnen Sunday Zōkan from the October 1978 through November 1980 issues. The series was adapted into three anime television films and a live-action television drama. An altered version of the first anime film was released in theaters, with new and re-arranged music.

The story is about two friends who were star athletes in junior high school who decide, on entering high school, to join the struggling baseball club so they can have a challenge. The title comes from the nine members of a baseball team.

Plot summary
Just before entering Seishū High School, track star Katsuya Niimi and judo champion Susumu Karasawa see a girl crying as the school loses a baseball game. The boys decide to join the team and improve it in order to make her smile. The girl turns out to be Yuri Nakao, daughter of the baseball coach, and they learn the baseball team will be shut down if it doesn't start winning. The series follows the three, as well as pitcher Eiji Kurahashi, as Niimi and Karasawa learn about baseball and what it means to be one of nine players on a team, as they work together through high school make it to Kōshien.

Characters
Character voices listed are for the anime releases only.

 Center fielder on the Seishū High School baseball club, in love with Yuri. In junior high, he held the national records for the 100 meter and 200 m races for his age group. His favorite food is gomokuzushi. He wears the number 8 on his jersey.

 (TV movie 1), Mariko Kurata (TV movie 2), Narumi Yasuda (TV movie 3)
 The manager of the Seishū High School baseball club and daughter of the baseball coach. There is a growing romance between Yuri and Katsuya. 

 Right fielder on the Seishū High School baseball club. In junior high, he was the prefectural champion in judo. He wears the number 9.

 Left-handed pitching ace on the Seishū High School baseball club, and was one of the top pitchers in all of Japan in middle school. Lives with his father, a truck driver.

 Star athlete of the Seishū High School track club, who has a crush on Katsuya since Middle School. After transferring to Seishū at the beginning of the school year, she begins pursuing him, much to the annoyance of Yuri.

 A childhood friend of Yuri, and ace pitcher at Bunan High School where he has taken his team to victory at Kōshien. After an unexpected reunion with Yuri, he becomes the romantic rival of Katsuya.

 Kentarō's younger brother and a new member of the Seishū High School baseball club, playing third base. He has a crush on Yukimi. He wears the number 5.

 Younger sister of the Yamanaka brothers. She tries to mediate the relationship between Yuri and Kentarō, who in turn uses her to interfere with the developing romance between Yuri and Katsuya.

Coach Nakao
 (TV movies), Kōichi Kitamura (theatrical movie)
 The coach of the Seishū High School baseball club. He is in jeopardy of losing his job for not having won a single game, which he does with the addition of Eiji Kurahashi to the team. He formerly coached Kentarō for a short time when he was younger, and they were neighbours.

Kazuya Niimi's father

 A former baseball player who helps Eiji join the baseball team after talking to his father, with whom he formed the winning battery at the invitational Kōshien tournament of 20-odd years prior to the events of the manga.

Kazuya Niimi's mother

Appears in the theatrical movie.

Eiji Kurashashi's father

Appears in the theatrical movie.

Yukimi Yasuda's grandmother

Appears in the theatrical movie.

Sources:

TV movies

Nine
The first Nine TV movie aired on May 4, 1983 on Fuji TV's Nissei Family Special program.

Music
Opening theme

Vocals: Mariko Tsubota
Lyrics: Masao Urino
Composer: Hiroaki Serizawa

Insert songs

Vocals: Mariko Tsubota and Hiroaki Serizawa
Lyrics: Masao Urino
Composer: Hiroaki Serizawa

Ending theme

Vocals: Mariko Tsubota and Hiroaki Serizawa
Lyrics: Masao Urino
Composer: Hiroaki Serizawa

Staff
Director: Gisaburō Sugii
Teleplay: Hiroichi Fuse
Animation Director: Tsuneo Maeda
Art Director: Hiroshi Ōhno
Music: Hiroaki Serizawa
Audio Director: Atsushi Tashiro
Production: Toho, Group TAC, Fuji TV

Sources:

Nine 2: Sweetheart Declaration
The second Nine TV movie, aired on December 18, 1983 on Fuji TV's Nissei Family Special program.

Music
Opening theme

Vocals: Mariko Tsubota
Lyrics: Mariko Ryū
Composer: Hiroaki Serizawa

Insert songs

Vocals: Mariko Tsubota and Hiroaki Serizawa
Lyrics: Mariko Ryū
Composer: Hiroaki Serizawa

Ending theme
"Midsummer Runner"
Vocals: Mariko Tsubota and Hiroaki Serizawa
Lyrics: Masao Urino
Composer: Hiroaki Serizawa

Staff
Director: Gisaburō Sugii
Teleplay: Shin'ichi Shirayama
Animation Director: Tsuneo Maeda
Chief Animator: Minoru Maeda
Art Director: Katsuyoshi Kanemura
Music: Hiroaki Serizawa
Audio Director: Atsushi Tashiro
Production: Toho, Group TAC, Fuji TV

Sources:

Nine: Final
The third Nine TV movie, aired on September 5, 1984 on Fuji TV's Nissei Family Special program.

Music
Opening theme

Vocals: Hiroaki Serizawa
Lyrics: Masao Urino
Composer: Hiroaki Serizawa

Insert songs

Vocals: Hiroaki Serizawa
Lyrics: Masao Urino
Composer: Hiroaki Serizawa

Ending theme
"Midsummer Runner"
Vocals: Mariko Tsubota and Hiroaki Serizawa
Lyrics: Masao Urino
Composer: Hiroaki Serizawa

Staff
Director: Gisaburō Sugii
Teleplay: Yumiko Takaboshi
Animation Director: Tsuneo Maeda
Key Animation Director: Minoru Maeda
Art Director: Katsuyoshi Kanemura
Music: Hiroaki Serizawa
Audio Director: Atsushi Tashiro
Production: Toho, Group TAC, Fuji TV

Sources:

Theatrical movie
The first Nine TV movie was remade into a theatrical movie titled , released  on September 16, 1983 by Toho. Modifications were made to the original TV movie to fix problems with it, and some of the voice actors and background music were changed as well. When the Nine movies are rebroadcast on TV, this movie is shown in place of the original TV movie.

Music
Theme songs

Vocals: Mariko Kurata
Lyrics: Masao Urino
Composer: Hiroaki Serizawa

Insert songs
"Invited Desires"

"Midsummer Runner"
Vocals: Mariko Kurata and Hiroaki Serizawa
Lyrics: Masao Urino
Composer: Hiroaki Serizawa

Staff
Director: Gisaburō Sugii
Screenplay: Hiroichi Fuse
Animation Director: Tsuneo Maeda
Art Director: Hiroshi Ōhno
Music: Hiroaki Serizawa, Yasunori Tsuchida
Audio Director: Atsushi Tashiro
Producers: Yūkichi Ōhashi, Atsushi Tashiro
Production: Toho, Group TAC, Fuji TV

Sources:

TV live action drama
A Nine live action TV drama special aired on January 5, 1987 on Fuji TV's  program.

Cast
Aki Asakura (Yuri Nakao)
Kazuya Takahashi (Katsuya Niimi)
Kōyō Maeda (Jirō Yamanaka)
Mikio Ōsawa (Kentarō Yamanaka)
Mami Ōtsuka (Yukimi Yasuda)

Staff
Original Work: Mitsuru Adachi
Director: Yoshiharu Ueki
Teleplay: Fumiyo Asō
Production: Fuji TV

Sources:

References

External links
 

1978 manga
1983 anime films
1983 television films
1983 films
1984 anime films
1984 television films
1984 films
1987 television specials
Anime television films
Baseball in anime and manga
Anime films based on manga
Films directed by Gisaburō Sugii
Fuji TV original programming
Group TAC
Japanese television dramas based on manga
1980s Japanese-language films
Mitsuru Adachi
Shogakukan manga
Shōnen manga
Live-action films based on manga